Westwood may refer to:

Companies and brands
Westwood, Baillie, 19th-century engineering and shipbuilding company, London
Westwood One (1976–2011), a former American radio network based in New York City
Westwood One, an American radio and media broadcasting company
Westwood Studios, an American video game developer, defunct since 2003
Westwood, a brand of American manufacturer Ariens

Educational institutions
Westwood College, several campuses in the United States
Westwood Elementary School (Prince George), British Columbia
Westwood Elementary School (Coquitlam), British Columbia
Westwood High School (disambiguation), several schools
Westwood International School, Gaborone, Botswana
Westwood Regional School District, Bergen County, New Jersey
Westwood Secondary School, Singapore
Westwood Secondary School (now Lincoln M. Alexander Secondary School), Mississauga, Ontario

People
Westwood (surname)
Baron Westwood, a title in the British peerage

Places

Australia 
Westwood, Queensland, a town in the Rockhampton Region
Westwood, Tasmania

Canada 
Westwood, Asphodel-Norwood, Ontario
Westwood, Edmonton, a neighbourhood in Edmonton, Alberta
Westwood Plateau, an area of Coquitlam, British Columbia
Westwood Motorsport Park, a race track in Coquitlam, British Columbia
Westwood, St. James-Assiniboia, Winnipeg, Manitoba
Port Moody-Westwood, a provincial electoral district for the Legislative Assembly of British Columbia
Port Moody—Westwood—Port Coquitlam, a federal electoral district in British Columbia

England 
Westwood, Peterborough, Cambridgeshire
Westwood, Greater Manchester, a district of Oldham
Westwood, Kent
Westwood Cross shopping centre
Westwood House, country house near Droitwich, Worcestershire
Westwood, Somerset, village in West Bagborough parish
Westwood, Southfleet, Kent
Westwood, Wiltshire
High Westwood, County Durham
Low Westwood, County Durham
Westwood Heath, Coventry, West Midlands
Westwood (Campus), University of Warwick
Westwoodside, North Lincolnshire
Stretton Westwood and Bourton Westwood, Shropshire

Scotland 
Westwood, East Kilbride, South Lanarkshire

United States 
Westwood (Uniontown, Alabama), an 1836 historic district on the National Register of Historic Places
Westwood, California
Westwood, Los Angeles, a neighborhood
Westwood Village Memorial Park Cemetery
Westwood, Indiana
Westwood, Iowa
Westwood, Kansas
Westwood, Boyd County, Kentucky
Westwood, Jefferson County, Kentucky
Westwood, Massachusetts
Westwood, Memphis, Tennessee, a neighborhood
Westwood, Michigan
Westwood, Missouri
Westwood, New Jersey
Westwood, Cincinnati, a neighborhood
Westwood, Cambria County, Pennsylvania, a census-designated place
Westwood, Chester County, Pennsylvania, a census-designated place
Westwood (Pittsburgh), Pennsylvania, a neighborhood
West Wood, Utah, a census-designated place
Westwood, Bainbridge Island, Washington
Westwood, Seattle
Westwood (subdivision), Houston
Westwood Highlands, San Francisco, a neighborhood
Westwood Hills, Kansas
Westwood Lakes, Florida, a census-designated place
Westwood Park, San Francisco, a neighborhood
Westwoods Trails, a hiking trail system in Connecticut

Transportation
Westwood station (LIRR), in Malverne, New York
Westwood station (NJ Transit), in Westwood, New Jersey
Westwood Boulevard, Los Angeles, California
Westwood/Rancho Park station
Westwood/UCLA station, a subway station under construction

Other uses
Westwood (computer virus), a minor variant of the Jerusalem virus
Westwood Cross, shopping centre in Kent, England
Westwood rim, a type of bicycle wheel rim
"Sons of Westwood", fight song of the University of California, Los Angeles
TCP Westwood, a congestion avoidance mechanism in data transmission
TCP Westwood plus, a modification of TCP Westood
Westwood, a novel by Stella Gibbons

See also
West Wood (disambiguation)